The 2006–07 Netball Superleague season saw Team Bath finish as champions for the second time. Team Bath retained the title without losing a single match all season. For a second successive season they defeated Galleria Mavericks in the grand final. This was also the first season that Sky Sports began to broadcast matches.

Overview
In November 2006 it was announced that Sky Sports would begin to broadcast Superleague matches. Team Bath retained the title without losing a single match all season.

Teams

Regular season

Final table

Grand Final

References

 
2006-07
 
 
2007 in Welsh women's sport
2006 in Welsh women's sport